Joah Tucker is an American professional basketball player who last played for the Milwaukee Blast of the American Basketball Association. He played for the NCAA Division I Milwaukee Panthers between 2004–2006 where he was member of the team that made the Sweet Sixteen for the first time in school history. He was also previously a member of the Harlem Globetrotters.

References
ESPN Profile

1983 births
Living people
American expatriate basketball people in France
Basketball players from Milwaukee
Bradley Braves men's basketball players
Harlem Globetrotters players
Limoges CSP players
Milwaukee Panthers men's basketball players
Power forwards (basketball)
Small forwards
STB Le Havre players
American men's basketball players